Mahadeva Temple, Kalanjoor popularly known as Thrikkalanjoor Sree Mahadeva temple is a Hindu temple. It is 80 kilometers to the south-west of the Sabarimala temple on the Punular-Muvattupuzha highway in Pathanamthitta District, Kerala, India. A majestic banyan tree, flanked by an Althara that is visible from a distance for any traveler on the main road, announces the presence of the temple to the devotee.

A Mandapam artistically etched with magnificent mural paintings announcing the prowess of artists and artisans of yore surrounds the banyan tree. Inside the Mandapam there is an idol of Nataraja, the dancing manifestation of Lord Shiva, facing the east.. From this Mandapam towards the west, a 60 feet high Gopuram (artistically carved towering arches) could be seen on the eastern side. The 18 ascending steps from the Gopuram lead to the sacred idols of Indiliyappan (Sastha) and the Mahasiva idol, which is the presiding deity of the Mahadeva temple.

Due to the presence of Mahadeva and Sastha idols in the temple, there are two Dhwajas (towering flag posts coated with copper) adjacent to each other which is a rare spectacle seldom seen in other temples. The Mahasiva idol and the Sastha idols are installed facing each other in this temple. The real name of the temple is Sankarapurathu Mukkalvattom Devaswom, but is popularly known as Thrikkalanjoor Sree Mahadeva temple.

Festivals

The annual temple festival starts in the Malayalam month of Meenam (March/April) and ends with Thiruvathira Arattu. The festival lasts eight days. On the sixth day Indilayappan festival is celebrated. Renowned artists from South India participate in this festival, which is famous for its Carnatic music renditions. Great exponents of Carnatic music like Chembai, Chemmankudi, Balamuralee Krishna, Yesudas, Seshagopal have performed here. Kathakali and other classical arts are other major attractions during the festival.

Kalamezhuthum Pattum for Indiliyappan (Sastha) and 41 days bhajan during Mandalapooja (December/January), Shivarathri, Ashtamirohini, Bhagavatha Sapthaham during the Malayalam month of Dhanu (January/February), Ramayana masam, Vinayaka Chathurthi, Ponkala, Pathamudayam etc. are a few other notable festive occasions that occur throughout the year.

See also
 Sabarimala
 Sri Padmanabhaswamy temple
 Vadakkunnathan Temple
 Vaikom Temple
 Vazhappally Maha Siva Temple
 Padanilam Parabrahma Temple
 Mammiyoor Temple
 Temples of Kerala
 List of Hindu temples in Kerala
 Arucalikkal Mahadeva Temple

External links 
 http://www.kalanjoormahadevatemple.org/index.html

Krishna temples
Vishnu temples
Hindu temples in Pathanamthitta district
Shiva temples in Kerala